The Tusas Mountains are a mountain range in northern New Mexico, extending slightly  into southern Colorado. They are considered the southeasternmost part of the San Juan Mountains. Grouse Mesa, is the highest peak in the range. The mountains are located to the west of Taos and northwest of Santa Fe. The Tusas Mountains are a wide region of upland mesas and gently sloping mountains, dissected in places by deep canyons.

Geography
The eastern part of the range is primarily located in the Carson National Forest, bordered by the Taos Plateau volcanic field and Rio Grande del Norte National Monument to the east. It provides the headwaters for the Rio San Antonio, a tributary of the Conejos River (which flows into the Rio Grande in Colorado), and further south the Rio Tusas and Rio Vallecito, which form the Rio Ojo Caliente, a tributary of the Rio Chama (also a Rio Grande tributary). Numerous volcanic features are located along the eastern edge of the range bordering the Taos plateau including nearby San Antonio Mountain.

Much of the western part of the range, also known as the Brazos Mountains, is in the privately held Tierra Amarilla Land Grant. The terrain consists of harder granite and metamorphic rock, and is more rugged than the eastern side. It includes features such as the Brazos Cliffs and several small mountain lakes including Hidden Lake and Sugar Loaf Lake. It is drained primarily by the Rio Chama and its tributary the Rio Brazos.

History
Gold and silver were discovered in the Tusas in 1881, but the deposits were of low quality and the area never saw significant mining activity.

In 1986 the United States Board on Geographic Names redefined the Brazos Mountains, originally considered a separate mountain range, as part of the Tusas Mountains, although the old name is still locally used.

Highest peaks

References

Works cited
</ref>

Mountain ranges of New Mexico
Mountain ranges of Colorado
San Juan Mountains (Colorado)